The Ángel Cabrera Classic was a golf tournament on the TPG Tour, the official professional golf tour in Argentina. It was held at the Jockey Club Córdoba, in Córdoba Province.

Winners

References

Golf tournaments in Argentina